Hastings William Sackville Russell, 12th Duke of Bedford (21 December 1888 – 9 October 1953) was a British peer. He was born at Cairnsmore House, Minnigaff, Kirkcudbrightshire, the son of Herbrand Russell, 11th Duke of Bedford, and his wife Mary Du Caurroy Tribe, the aviator and ornithologist. He was known for both his career as a naturalist and for his involvement in far-right politics.

Early life
Educated at Eton College, Russell graduated from Balliol College, Oxford with a Master of Arts (M.A.). He gained the rank of Lieutenant in the 10th Battalion, Middlesex Regiment, but never fought in the First World War owing to ill health.

Naturalism
A keen naturalist, Russell arranged a 1906 expedition to Shaanxi, China to collect zoological specimens for the British Museum, during which Arthur de Carle Sowerby discovered a new species of jerboa. He was also closely involved in his father's ultimately successful efforts to preserve the Père David's deer, a Chinese species that was close to extinction in the late 19th and early 20th centuries.

He was also an ornithologist, specialising in parrots and budgerigars, to whom he would feed chocolates, although his eldest son was often reduced to eating them; his other pets included a spider to whom, according to Nancy Mitford's The English Aristocracy, he would regularly feed roast beef and Yorkshire pudding.

While known as the Marquess of Tavistock, he wrote "Parrots and Parrot-like Birds". He was a founder member and first President of the Foreign Bird League. He was successful in breeding many species, including the Tahiti Blue Lorikeet and Ultramarine Lorikeet. Both of these are recognised as the world's first breedings in captivity. The Marquess disposed of his birds upon succeeding to the Dukedom in 1939.

Politics

Pre-war activity
Russell was active in politics for much of his life. In his youth he flirted with socialism and even communism but soon abandoned these in favour of Social Credit, establishing his own National Credit Association to promote the ideology. He addressed the membership of the New Party about Social Credit but the scheme was not taken up by Sir Oswald Mosley's group. Russell was also a leading figure in the Economic Reform Club. He admired the growing fascist movements in Europe and wrote in the New English Weekly in support of the Anschluss in 1938.

Russell was a founder of the British People's Party (BPP) in 1939 and used his money to bankroll the group from then on. The driving force behind the BPP was John Beckett, a former Labour Member of Parliament who had also been a member of the British Union of Fascists and the National Socialist League. According to his son, Francis Beckett, John Beckett had little real devotion to the unassuming and uncharismatic Russell but was attracted to the BPP as much by the Marquess' money as any real conviction, Beckett himself being virtually penniless at the time.

During the war
Russell was friendly with Barry Domvile, the founder of the Link, and had been close to that semi-clandestine group since its establishment in 1937. In the early months of the Second World War, he attended several meetings of leading figures on the far-right that Domvile had organised, although he was largely unenthusiastic about this initiative.

Russell chaired the British Council for Christian Settlement in Europe, established immediately after the declaration of war and featuring an eclectic melange of fascists, fascist sympathisers and committed pacifists. He was a committed pacifist across the board, rejecting war entirely, in contrast to Beckett and several other leading members of the group who were opposed specifically to war with Nazi Germany rather than to war as a concept. During the early days of the war, Russell was also courted by the British Union of Fascists (BUF), who had changed their name to the British Union, and held meetings with Neil Francis Hawkins, the group's Director-General. He had earlier been a sometime member of the January Club, a BUF-linked discussion group. He had grown close to BUF member Robert Gordon-Canning, and under his influence even came to write for the BUF's newspaper Action. Nonetheless, in private BUF leader Sir Oswald Mosley dismissed Russell as "woolly-headed".

At the start of 1940, he corresponded with the Home Secretary Sir John Anderson after obtaining a document from the German legation in Dublin that Russell claimed contained Adolf Hitler's draft proposals for peace. Following the obtaining of this document by Russell, on 13 March 1940 Domvile organised a meeting for both men, Mosley and Imperial Fascist League (IFL) veteran Bertie Mills to discuss their next course of action. At this meeting, Mosley proposed the creation of a "Peace Government" to be led by David Lloyd George, although nothing more came of this initiative as the government soon launched a crackdown on far-right activity.

Leading figures were interned under Defence Regulation 18B although Russell was not among their number. Russell's nobility helped to ensure that he avoided arrest along with other far-right leaning noblemen such as the Lord Lymington, the Duke of Buccleuch, the Duke of Westminster, the Earl of Mar, Lord Brocket, Lord Queenborough and others. His personal links to Foreign Secretary Lord Halifax also helped to ensure his freedom. He wrote a series of letter to Halifax in the early days of the war expressing his admiration for Hitler and urging him to use his influence to bring the war to a swift conclusion. Russell was, however, placed on the "Suspect List" by MI5 as some within that group suspected that, in the event of a successful Nazi invasion of the UK, Russell might have ended up as Governor of the territory or even Prime Minister of a puppet government.

Beckett however was among those held, and Russell attempted to intervene on his behalf, assisting Beckett's common-law wife Anne Cutmore in a letter-writing campaign to secure his release. When Beckett was released Cutmore again asked Russell, by then Duke of Bedford, for help as they were penniless and he agreed to allow them to live in a cottage in the village of Chenies, at the time entirely owned by the Duchy. He would continue to underwrite the Becketts until his death in 1953, even purchasing a large house in Rickmansworth for the family's use in 1949.

Post-war
Russell re-established the BPP in 1945, the group having been in abeyance during the later years of the war. Party activity was limited and often restricted to irregular party functions hosted at the Becketts' house in Rickmansworth. Increasingly associated with the anti-Semitism espoused by leading BPP figures, Russell stated that the figure of six million Jewish deaths in the Holocaust was "grossly exaggerated" and argued that a figure of 300,000 concentration camp deaths, drawn from all those interned rather than just Jews, was more likely. He also denied that any concentration camp had a gas chamber, claiming they were just showers. He also funded the publication of Failure at Nuremberg, a pamphlet authored by the "BPP Research Department" (effectively Beckett, A. K. Chesterton and former IFL member Harold Lockwood) which denounced the Nuremberg trials of leading Nazis as a series of show trials that started from the basis of presumed guilt on the part of the defendants. Unusually, he also contributed articles on Social Credit and pacifism to anarchist Guy Aldred's journal, The Word, between 1940 and his death.

Personal life
In London, Middlesex, on 21 November 1914, he married Louisa Crommelin Roberta Jowitt Whitwell; the couple had three children: 
 John Ian Robert Russell, 13th Duke of Bedford (1917–2002), who supplied a detailed and hostile portrait of him in the 1959 memoir A Silver-Plated Spoon;
 Lady Daphne Crommelin Russell (2 September 1920 – 1 June 1991); 
 Lord Hugh Hastings Russell (1923–2005), a conscientious objector in the Second World War, married Rosemary Markby and had issue.

Russell was a committed Evangelical Christian and vegetarian. An austere man who detested alcohol, tobacco and gambling, he was even sued by his wife in the 1930s for "restoration of conjugal rights" after the pair became estranged. The case was dismissed after much press coverage with his wife's description of him as "the most cold, mean and conceited person" she had ever known being widely reported. Following his death, the sentiments were largely echoed by his eldest son – who shared none of his father's political views and had a difficult relationship with him – who stated "my father was the loneliest man I ever knew, incapable of giving or receiving love, utterly self-centred and opinionated. He loved birds, animals, peace, monetary reform, the park and religion. He also had a wife and three children".

Russell put his 11-acre estate, the Chateau Malet in Cap-d'Ail near Monaco for sale through Knight, Frank & Rutley in 1921.

Death
Russell died in 1953, aged 64, as a result of a gunshot wound in the grounds of his Endsleigh Estate in Devon. The coroner recorded his death as accidentally inflicted, but his elder son suggested it may have been deliberately self-inflicted.

Bibliography
 Francis Beckett, The Rebel Who Lost His Cause – The Tragedy of John Beckett MP, London: Allison and Busby, 1999
 Stephen Dorril, Blackshirt: Sir Oswald Mosley & British Fascism, London: Penguin Books, 2007
 Richard Griffiths, Fellow Travellers on the Right, Oxford: Oxford University Press, 1983
 Martin Pugh, 'Hurrah for the Blackshirts!': Fascists and Fascism in Britain between the Wars, London: Pimlico, 2006
 Richard Thurlow, Fascism in Britain: From Oswald Mosley's Blackshirts to the National Front, London: IB Tauris, 1998

References

 "Burke's Peerage and Baronetage"

External links
 

1888 births
1953 deaths
20th-century English nobility
20th-century British zoologists
Alumni of Balliol College, Oxford
British Army personnel of World War I
English Christian pacifists
English evangelicals
English fascists
British Holocaust deniers
English ornithologists
British Union of Fascists politicians
Deaths by firearm in England
412
Middlesex Regiment officers
People educated at Eton College
H
Firearm accident victims
Accidental deaths in England